Henry Chidozie Ugwunna (born 19 May 1989) is a Nigerian football forward who plays for VV Prinsenland. He also holds Finnish citizenship.

Club career
In February 2015, Ugwunna joined the Finnish Veikkausliiga club FC Ilves.

References

External links

1989 births
Living people
Association football forwards
Nigerian footballers
Nigerian expatriate footballers
Clube de Regatas Brasil players
FC Haka players
Haaglandia players
Agremiação Sportiva Arapiraquense players
Finnish people of Nigerian descent
Naturalized citizens of Finland
Nigerian expatriate sportspeople in Finland